Ricardo Pedriel Suárez (born 19 January 1987) is a Bolivian footballer who plays as a forward for Wilstermann.

Club career
In 2009–10, Pedriel was demoted to the B squad of Steaua București.

In July 2009, he agreed a loan deal with Giresunspor, which participates in the Bank Asya First League.

In June 2010, he agreed a deal with Sivasspor.

International career
Pedriel was picked to join Bolivia in the 2007 U-20 South American Championship held in Paraguay, where he played in four games.

On 6 February 2008, he made his debut with the senior Bolivia national team during a friendly match against Peru in La Paz, scoring his first international goal.

As of June 2016, he represented his country in 3 FIFA World Cup qualification matches.

International goals
Scores and results list Bolivia's goal tally first. "Score" column indicates the score after the player's goal.

References

External links
 Ricardo Pedriel's profile – SteauaFC.com (Romanian) 
 
 
 Ricardo Pedriel's career – conmebol.com (English)

1987 births
Living people
Sportspeople from Santa Cruz de la Sierra
Association football forwards
Bolivian footballers
Bolivia international footballers
2011 Copa América players
2015 Copa América players
C.D. Jorge Wilstermann players
FC Steaua București players
FC Steaua II București players
Giresunspor footballers
Sivasspor footballers
Club Bolívar players
Mersin İdman Yurdu footballers
Bolivian expatriate footballers
Expatriate footballers in Romania
Bolivian expatriate sportspeople in Romania
Bolivian expatriate sportspeople in Turkey
Expatriate footballers in Turkey
Liga I players
Süper Lig players
Bolivia youth international footballers